The 1995 German Figure Skating Championships took place on January 5–8, 1995 in Oberstdorf. Skaters competed in the disciplines of men's singles, ladies' singles, pair skating, ice dancing, and precision skating.

Results

Men

Ladies

Pairs

Ice dancing

Precision skating

External links
 1995 German Championships results

German Figure Skating Championships, 1995
German Figure Skating Championships